Magne Lystad (12 November 1932, in Kongsvinger – 21 January 1999, in Oslo) was a Norwegian orienteering competitor.

Magne Lystad won the first ever European championships in orienteering in 1962, and finished second in the team relay. He became Nordic champion in 1957 and 1959. Lystad was crowned Norwegian champion seven times between 1954 and 1962.  

In 1957 Lystad shared the title Norwegian Sportsperson of the Year with speedskater Knut Johannesen.

References 

1932 births
1999 deaths
Norwegian orienteers
Male orienteers
Foot orienteers
Sportspeople from Kongsvinger
20th-century Norwegian people